Lend a Paw is an animated short film produced in Technicolor by Walt Disney Productions, distributed by RKO Radio Pictures and released to theaters on October 3, 1941. Lend a Paw was directed by Clyde Geronimi and features original music by Leigh Harline. George Nicholas, Kenneth Muse, Nick Nichols, William Sturm, Eric Gurney, Norman Tate, Chick Otterstrom, Morey Reden, and Emery Hawkins animated the film. The voice cast includes Walt Disney as Mickey and Teddy Barr as Pluto. It was the 115th short in the Mickey Mouse film series to be released, and the sixth for that year.

In the cartoon, which was largely a remake of the 1933 short Mickey's Pal Pluto, Pluto saves the life of a kitten, and later feels jealous towards the kitten after Mickey Mouse takes the kitten in. The film won the Academy Award for Best Animated Short Film at the 14th Academy Awards in 1942, the only Mickey Mouse short to win the award.

Plot
While out in the snow, Pluto hears meowing noises coming from a bag floating on a drifting ice floe. He saves it, only to lose interest when he finds an orange kitten inside. The kitten follows him home and Mickey immediately adopts it. Pluto becomes jealous of all the attention the kitten gets and is coerced by his shoulder devil to get it in trouble. Despite his shoulder angel's attempts to talk him out of it, the devil gets rid of the angel by jabbing him with his trident. Pluto tries to trick the kitten into attacking Mickey's goldfish Bianca, only for it to drag the fishbowl towards the edge of the table. The devil warns Pluto to run, but he fails to get away in time as the fishbowl, the kitten, and a lamp fall on him. This gets Mickey's attention and after some pondering, he demands answers from Bianca. She points to Pluto, knowing that he's the one trying to get the kitten into trouble in the first place, to the latter's horror. Mickey angrily kicks a guilty Pluto out of the house for the remainder of the day as punishment for the mess he made, and Pluto angrily blames his shoulder devil for getting him into trouble.

Eventually, the kitten ends up being outside as well while chasing a ball, accidentally falling into a well. The angel tells Pluto to save it, but the devil furiously tells him to let it drown as revenge for getting him kicked out. Finally having enough of the devil's uncaring attitude, the angel chases off the devil by punching him into oblivion and convinces Pluto to do the right thing, only for him to fall in too. Hearing Pluto's cries, Mickey saves them both and comforts a near frozen Pluto after ramming him into the top of the well to break the ice that he's frozen in, feeling very remorseful for kicking him out. After receiving a nice hot bath from Mickey and a thank you kiss from the kitten, Pluto is told by the angel "Kindness to animals, my friend, will be rewarded in the end".

Voice cast
 Mickey Mouse: Walt Disney
 Pluto: Teddy Barr
 Pluto's angel: John McLeish
 Pluto's devil: John Dehner
 Kitten: Marcellite Garner

Legacy
Pluto's angel and devil reappeared, played by Eric Idle and Penn Jillette respectively, in two episodes of Mickey Mouse Works -- "Pluto's Kittens" (1999) and "Minnie Takes Care of Pluto" (2000) -- as well as a 2002 episode of House of Mouse, "Pluto vs Figaro," and in the Mickey Mouse episode, Easy Street, however, the angel actually agrees with the devil's plan remarking "Amen".

Releases
 1941 – theatrical release
 1954 – Disneyland, episode #1.6: "A Story of Dogs" (TV)
 c. 1972 – The Mouse Factory, episode #29: "Consciences" (TV)
 c. 1992 – Mickey's Mouse Tracks, episode #67 (TV)
 c. 1992 – Donald's Quack Attack, episode #15 (TV)
 1993 – The Adventures of Mickey and Donald, episode #1 (TV)

Home media
The short was released on December 7, 2004 on Walt Disney Treasures: The Complete Pluto: 1930-1947.

Additional releases include:
 1981 – "Mickey Mouse and Donald Duck Cartoon Collections Volume Three" (VHS)
 1998 – "The Spirit of Mickey" (VHS)
 c. 2002 – Bonus on Oliver and Company (DVD/VHS, only in USA/Canada)
 2005 – "Classic Cartoon Favorites: Holiday Celebration with Mickey and Pals" (DVD)
 2006 – Bonus on The Fox and the Hound (25th anniversary edition DVD)
 2009 – Bonus on Oliver and Company (20th anniversary edition DVD)
 2013 – Bonus on Oliver and Company (25th anniversary edition Blu-ray)

See also
Mickey Mouse (film series)

References

External links
 
 

1941 short films
1941 animated films
1941 comedy films
1941 drama films
American comedy-drama films
Best Animated Short Academy Award winners
1940s Disney animated short films
Disney film remakes
1940s English-language films
Films scored by Leigh Harline
Films directed by Clyde Geronimi
Films produced by Walt Disney
Mickey Mouse short films
Pluto (Disney) short films
Short film remakes
RKO Pictures animated short films
American animated short films
RKO Pictures short films
Animated films about mice
Animated films about dogs
Animated films about cats